Zuni Mountain Stupa is a Tibetan Buddhist temple of the Nyingma school in the Zuni Mountains in Grants, New Mexico, consecrated in 2009.  A library of Buddhist texts from the Tengyur and the Kangyur is stored in the dome.

History
Bhakha Rinpoche came to the US in the 1980s. He has been teaching at the Zuni Mountain land since 1989. The temple was established by Bhakha Rinpoche and his organization, the Vairotsana Foundation.  The Vairotsana Foundation is headquartered in Tularosa, New Mexico, the Orgyen Choling Tibetan Buddhist Center.

Construction on the temple started in 2004 and was completed in 2009. The temple was consecrated September 5–6, 2009. The complex also includes a cooking house and a prayer wheel house, built in 2001.

Construction
The temple stupa is built in the style known as Duddul Chodten, a style which honors the Buddha's dispelling of negative forces. The dome, called a  bumpa,  is modeled on that of Boudhanath in Nepal. Construction took five years.

See also

Buddhism in the United States
List of Buddhist temples

References

Further reading

External links

2009 establishments in New Mexico
Asian-American culture in New Mexico
Buildings and structures in Cibola County, New Mexico
Buddhist temples in New Mexico
Nyingma monasteries and temples
Religious buildings and structures completed in 2009
Tibetan Buddhism in the United States
Stupas in the United States